Dorset Council may refer to:

 Dorset Council (UK), local government district in England
 Dorset Council (Australia), local government area in Tasmania, Australia
 Dorset County Council, the former county council for the county of Dorset in England

See also
 Dorset (disambiguation)